Bulga Downs Station is a pastoral lease that once operated as a sheep station but is now a cattle station located in the Mid West region of Western Australia.

Bulga Downs consists primarily of sand-plain country with outcrops of granite and ironstone. The trees and shrubs found in the area include mulga, sugar-brother, bowgada, mallee gums, saltbush and bluebush. Prominent grasses include broadleaf and narrowleaf wanderrie, kerosene grass, wind grass and white top granite grass.

The property was owned in 1921 by W. Baumberger, who sold it in 1923 to Messrs. Morrison and Calder. The  station was only partially improved at the time and was only carrying 1,500 sheep and some cattle. It was also experiencing problems with wild dogs attacking the stock.

In 1925 a total of 23,238 sheep were shorn at Bulga Downs. By 1928 the size of the flock had dropped to 4,879.

The McQuie family acquired the  property in 1984 and converted the station from grazing sheep to Angus cattle during the 1990's due to dingo problems. The last shearing was conducted in 2000 or 2001. J McQuie 2021.

See also
List of ranches and stations
List of pastoral leases in Western Australia

References

Homesteads in Western Australia
Pastoral leases in Western Australia
Mid West (Western Australia)
Stations (Australian agriculture)